Sun City West is an unincorporated community and census-designated place (CDP) in Maricopa County, Arizona, United States. The population was 25,806 at the 2020 census.

Geography
It is bordered to the south, west, and north by the city of Surprise. U.S. Route 60 runs along the southwest border of the community, and the Arizona State Route 303 freeway bounds the community to the north and northwest.

Demographics

At the 2010 census there were 24,535 people, 14,873 households, and 8,550 families in the CDP. The racial makeup of the CDP was 97.8% White, 0.8% Black or African American, 0.2% Native American, 0.6% Asian, 0.1% Pacific Islander, 0.2% from other races, and 0.5% from two or more races.  1.2% of the population were Hispanic or Latino of any race.
Of the 14,873 households, 14 had children under the age of 18 living with them, 54.5% were married couples living together, 2.3% had a female householder with no husband present, and 42.5% were non-families. 39.3% of households were one person and 35.4% were one person aged 65 or older.  The average household size was 1.64 and the average family size was 2.05.

The age distribution was 0.1% under the age of 14, 0.1% from 15 to 19, 0.1% from 15 to 24, 0.2% from 25 to 29, 0.2% from 30 to 34, 0.2% 35 to 39, 0.4% 45 to 49, 1.5% from 50 to 54, 3.6% 55 to 59, 9.2% from 60 to 64, 13.8% from 65 to 69, 17.2% from 70 to 74, 19.5% from 75 to 79, 18.3% from 80 to 84, and 14.8% who were 85 years of age or older. The median age was 75.6 years. For every 100 females age 18 and over, there were 77.6 males.

The median household income was $44,614 and the median family income  was $58,345. Males had a median income of $48,333 versus $33,125 for females. The per capita income for the CDP was $35,502.  About 2.5% of families and 5.4% of the population were below the poverty line, including none of those under age 18 and 5.0% of those age 65 or over.

History 
Sun City West was constructed on an  site to the west of Sun City, including part of the former Lizard Acres cattle ranch. Sun City West was completely built out in 1998, and a sister city, Sun City Grand, to the west of Grand Avenue was started.

Due to the 2019-20 coronavirus pandemic the city announced on March 11, 2020, the closures of all recreation centers to help reduce the spread of COVID-19. This later led to the closures of all seven golf courses on April 13, 2020.

Government
As an unincorporated area, Sun City West does not have a city government. Instead, Sun City West is "governed" by Property Owners and Residents Association (PORA), a community association that advocates for the Sun City West community.  

Municipal services are provided by a variety of public and private organizations.  Police services are provided by the Maricopa County Sheriff's Office. Street maintenance services are paid for by the taxpayers of the entire county. Fire service is provided by Arizona Fire and Medical Authority. Parks and recreation services are controlled by Recreation Centers of Sun City West, another community organization.

Infrastructure
Electric service is provided by Arizona Public Service. Natural gas is provided by Southwest Gas. Water and sewer utilities are provided by a private utility, Epcor Water.  Sanitation service is by a private hauler.

See also

 List of census-designated places in Arizona

References

External links

 Property Owners and Residents Association of Sun City West
 Recreation Centers of Sun City West

Census-designated places in Maricopa County, Arizona
Retirement communities
Phoenix metropolitan area